Goniobranchus hintuanensis is a species of colorful sea slug, a dorid nudibranch, a marine gastropod mollusk in the family Chromodorididae.

Distribution
This species was described from Balayan Bay, Luzon, Philippines. It has been reported from the Marshall Islands, Solomon Islands, Papua New Guinea, Indonesia, Thailand, Burma and Sri Lanka. Specimens from the Indian Ocean differ in having yellow spots in the paler patches of the dorsal pattern.

References

External links
 

Chromodorididae
Marine fauna of Asia
Molluscs of the Indian Ocean
Molluscs of the Pacific Ocean
Gastropods described in 1998